Naturally may refer to:

Albums
 Naturally!, an album by Nat Adderley
 Naturally (Houston Person album)
 Naturally (J. J. Cale album)
 Naturally (John Pizzarelli album)
 Naturally (Sharon Jones album)
 Naturally (Three Dog Night album)

Songs
 "Naturally" (Deborah Gibson song)
 "Naturally" (Kalapana song)
 "Naturally" (Selena Gomez & the Scene song)
 "Naturally", a song by Ayumi Hamasaki from I Am...
 "Naturally", a song by Heatwave from Current
 "Naturally", a song by Huey Lewis and the News from Fore!
 "Naturally", a song by Raffi from Bananaphone
 "Naturally", a song by Fat Mattress from Fat Mattress II
 "Naturally", a song by Katy Hudson (better known by her current stage name Katy Perry) from her debut album Katy Hudson

TV series
 Naturally (TV series), 2019 South Korean TV series